In mathematics, cylinder set measure (or promeasure, or premeasure, or quasi-measure, or CSM) is a kind of prototype for a measure on an infinite-dimensional vector space. An example is the Gaussian cylinder set measure on Hilbert space.

Cylinder set measures are in general not measures (and in particular need not be countably additive but only finitely additive), but can be used to define  measures, such as  classical Wiener measure on the set of continuous paths starting at the origin in Euclidean space.

Definition

Let  be a separable real topological vector space. Let  denote the collection of all surjective continuous linear maps  defined on  whose image is some finite-dimensional real vector space :

where  is a probability measure on  These measures are required to satisfy the following consistency condition: if  is a surjective projection, then the push forward of the measure is as follows:

Remarks

The consistency condition

is modelled on the way that true measures push forward (see the section cylinder set measures versus true measures). However, it is important to understand that in the case of cylinder set measures, this is a requirement that is part of the definition, not a result.

In practice, one often takes  to be the Borel -algebra on  In this case, one can show that when  is a separable Banach space, the σ-algebra generated by the cylinder sets is precisely the Borel -algebra of :

Cylinder set measures versus measures

When there is a measure  on  such that  in this way, it is customary to abuse notation slightly and say that the cylinder set measure  "is" the measure

Cylinder set measures on Hilbert spaces

The canonical Gaussian cylinder set measure on an infinite-dimensional separable Hilbert space  does not correspond to a true measure on  The proof is quite simple: the ball of radius  (and center 0) has measure at most equal to that of the ball of radius  in an -dimensional Hilbert space, and this tends to 0 as  tends to infinity. So the ball of radius  has measure 0; as the Hilbert space is a countable union of such balls it also has measure 0, which is a contradiction.

An alternative proof that the Gaussian cylinder set measure is not a measure uses the Cameron–Martin theorem and a result on the quasi-invariance of measures. If  really were a measure, then the identity function on  would radonify that measure, thus making  into an abstract Wiener space. In either case, we have a contradiction.

Sazonov's theorem gives conditions under which the push forward of a canonical Gaussian cylinder set measure can be turned into a true measure.

Nuclear spaces and cylinder set measures

A cylinder set measure on the dual of a nuclear Fréchet space automatically extends to a measure if its Fourier transform is continuous.

Example: Let  be the space of Schwartz functions on a finite dimensional vector space; it is nuclear. It is contained in the Hilbert space  of  functions, which is in turn contained in the space of tempered distributions  the dual of the nuclear Fréchet space :

The Gaussian cylinder set measure on  gives a cylinder set measure on the space of tempered distributions, which extends to a measure on the space of tempered distributions, 

See also

References

 I.M. Gel'fand,   N.Ya. Vilenkin,   Generalized functions. Applications of harmonic analysis, Vol 4, Acad. Press  (1968) 
 
 
 L. Schwartz, Radon measures.

Measures (measure theory)
Topological vector spaces